Digby is an English name of Old English (dic "dyke, ditch") and Old Norse (byr "farm, settlement") origin, derived from a place in County Lincolnshire.

Notable people and characters with the name include:

Surname
 Edward Digby (disambiguation), multiple people
 Grace Digby (1895-1964), British artist
 Henry Digby (disambiguation), multiple people
 Jane Digby (1807–1881), English aristocrat, famed for her love life and lifestyle.
 John Digby (disambiguation), multiple people
 Kenelm Digby (disambiguation), multiple people
 Lettice Digby (disambiguation), multiple people
 Marié Digby, American musician born 1983
 Robert Digby (disambiguation), multiple people
 Simon Digby (disambiguation), multiple people
 William Digby (disambiguation), multiple people

Given name
 Digby Denham (1859–1944), Premier of Queensland, Australia
 Digby Fairweather (born 1946), British jazz trumpeter and cornetist
 Digby Ioane (born 1985), Australian rugby union player
 Digby Jones, Baron Jones of Birmingham (born 1955), British businessman and politician
 Digby Morrell (born 1979), Australian rules football player
 Digby (blogger) or Heather Digby Parton, writer of the liberal blog Hullabaloo
 Digby Smith (born 1935), British military historian
 Digby Tatham-Warter (1917–1993), British army officer in the Second World War
 Digby Willoughby (disambiguation), multiple people

Fictional characters
 Albert Fitzwilliam Digby, batman and foil to Dan Dare in the Eagle series Dan Dare, Pilot of the Future and its revivals.
 Arthur Digby, a fictional character in Holby City
 Morven Digby, a fictional character in Holby City
 Salu Digby, Legion of Super-Heroes member
 Digby Geste, one of three brothers in the novel Beau Geste and its various adaptations
 the title character of Digby, the Biggest Dog in the World, a 1973 film starring Jim Dale
 a Cavalier King Charles Spaniel featured in the 2014 movie The Interview
 a Golden Retriever on the 2007–2009 television show Pushing Daisies
 a character in the video game series Animal Crossing

See also
 Baron Digby, a title in the Peerage of Ireland

References

Surnames
Masculine given names
English masculine given names
English-language surnames
English toponymic surnames